is a Japanese voice actor and singer affiliated with 81 Produce. He won the award for Best Rookie Actor at the 10th Seiyu Awards. His roles include Producer in The Idolmaster Cinderella Girls, Alexander Yamato in King of Prism, Juuza Hyoudo in A3!, Revolver in Yu-Gi-Oh! VRAINS, Zack Walker in Astra Lost in Space and Brawler in Akudama Drive.

Takeuchi is part of the musical duo Amadeus with rapper Lotus Juice, performing under the stage name Jack Westwood. He is also credited under that name for his music productions.

Biography

Personal life
He announced his marriage to Misato Kato on September 5, 2022.

Filmography

Anime series

Original video animation

Original net animation

Anime films

Video games
 2015
 The Idolmaster as Producer
 Granblue Fantasy as Barawa

 2016
The Caligula Effect as Shougo Satake
La Corda d'Oro as Sunaga Takumi
Elsword as Ain
 MapleStory as Shade
 Under Night In-Birth Exe:Late[st] as Enkidu

2017
Danganronpa V3: Killing Harmony as Gonta Gokuhara
Musou Stars as Oda Nobunyaga
Super Bomberman R as Black Bomber
Sengoku Night Blood as Kanbee Kuroda
Xenoblade Chronicles 2 as Wulfric (Jikarao)
Aka to Blue as Aka Sheenk
A3! as Juza Hyodo

2018
Fate/Grand Order as Chiron
Shinen Resist as Trueno

2019
Kingdom Hearts III as Olaf replacing Pierre Taki
Arknights as Rangers and Matterhorn

2020
The King of Fighters for Girls as Goro Daimon
Bleach: Brave Souls as Askin Nakk Le Vaar
Genshin Impact as Dvalin/Stormterror
Alchemy Stars as Barton

2021
Re:Zero − Starting Life in Another World: The Prophecy of the Throne as Salum
Ensemble Stars! as Gatekeeper
Rune Factory 5 as Murakumo
NEO: The World Ends with You as Hishima Sazakuchi
Cookie Run: Kingdom as Purple Yam Cookie
The Legend of Heroes: Kuro no Kiseki as Sherid Asverl
Gate of Nightmares as Ziguile
The Legend of Heroes: Kuro no Kiseki II – Crimson Sin, Sherid Asverl

2023
Street Fighter 6 as Jamie

Tokusatsu
 2021
 Mashin Sentai Kiramager vs. Ryusoulger as Evil voice
 Ultra Galaxy Fight: The Absolute Conspiracy as Zoffy
 2022
 Ultra Galaxy Fight: The Destined Crossroad as Zoffy

Dubbing

Live-action
Coming 2 America as Lavelle Junson (Jermaine Fowler)
Danger Close: The Battle of Long Tan as Private Paul Large (Daniel Webber)
Decision to Leave as Soo-wan (Go Kyung-pyo)
Dolittle as Humphrey (Tim Treloar)
Dungeons & Dragons: Honor Among Thieves as Edgin the Bard (Chris Pine)
Escape Room: Tournament of Champions as Theo (Carlito Olivero)
Final Cut as Mounir (Lyes Salem)
Happiest Season as John (Dan Levy)
Jaws 2 (2022 BS Tokyo edition) as Michael Brody (Mark Gruner)
Judas and the Black Messiah as William "Bill" O'Neal (Lakeith Stanfield)
Major Grom: Plague Doctor as Sergei Razumovsky / Plague Doctor (Sergei Goroshko)
The Matrix Resurrections as Berg (Brian J. Smith)
The Night Of as Nasir "Naz" Khan (Riz Ahmed)
St. Elmo's Fire (2022 The Cinema edition) as William Hicks (Rob Lowe)
The Suicide Squad as Richard "Dick" Hertz / Blackguard (Pete Davidson)
Teenage Mutant Ninja Turtles: Out of the Shadows as Trevor (Connor Fox)
Tomb Raider as Bruce (Josef Altin)
Top Gun: Maverick as Robert "Bob" Floyd (Lewis Pullman)
Uncharted as Samuel "Sam" Drake (Rudy Pankow)

Animation
DC League of Super-Pets as Cyborg
Encanto as Mariano Guzman
Frozen (revised dub) as Olaf (replaced Pierre Taki after his March 2019 arrest)
Frozen 2 as Olaf
Lookism as Lee Eun Tae/Vasco
RWBY as Vine Zeki
Thomas & Friends: All Engines Go as Gordon

Discography

Songwriting credits

Accolades

References

External links 
 Official agency profile 
 Official Amadeus site 
 

1997 births
Living people
Japanese male pop singers
Japanese male video game actors
Japanese male voice actors
Male voice actors from Tokyo
Singers from Tokyo
81 Produce voice actors
21st-century Japanese male actors
21st-century Japanese male singers
21st-century Japanese singers